Harry W. Colmery (December 11, 1890 – August 23, 1979) was an American attorney who served as the National Commander of The American Legion from 1936 to 1937. Considered the principal architect of the G.I. Bill, he was the first past national commander to earn the Legion's Distinguished Service Medal in 1975.

Early life and education
Born in North Braddock, Pennsylvania to Walter and Flora Colmery, Harry Walter Colmery was one of four children. He graduated from Oberlin College in 1913, from law school at the University of Pittsburgh in 1916, and was admitted to the Utah bar in 1917.

World War I
Colmery served in the United States Army Air Service during World War I as an instructor and pursuit pilot. He was honorably discharged on April 24, 1919.

Personal life
Colmery married his college sweetheart, Minerva Harriet Hiserodt, on December 20, 1919. They had three children: Mary, Harry W., Jr., and Sarah Elizabeth.

Legacy
The Colmery-O'Neil Veterans Administration Hospital in Topeka, Kansas, is named in honor of him.

Military awards

References

External links

Harry W. Colmery at The Political Graveyard

1890 births
1979 deaths
People from North Braddock, Pennsylvania
Kansas Republicans
Kansas lawyers
20th-century American lawyers
Oberlin College alumni
University of Pittsburgh School of Law alumni
National Commanders of the American Legion
United States Army Air Service pilots of World War I
United States Army officers
Burials in Kansas
Military personnel from Pennsylvania